Gloria Mohanty (27 June 1932 – 11 December 2014) was an Indian theatre, television and film actress who worked in the Odia film industry. She was honoured with the State's highest honour for contribution to Odia cinema – the Jayadeb Puraskar in 1994 and Odisha Sangeet Natak Akademi Award in 1992. Cultural organisation Srjan awarded her Guru Kelucharan Mohapatra Award for the year of 2011. and Life Time Achievement Award from Cultural organisation Ghungur in 2012.

Early life 
At a very young age, Mohanty got introduced to dance and music by her aunt and actress Anima Pedini. She learnt Odissi dance under Guru Kelucharan Mohapatra. At the National Music Association, Cuttack, she got trained in music. She was guided by famed singers as Balakrushna Dash and Bhubaneswar Mishra. Her interest and talent at a young age led to her long career.

Mohanty was a sportswoman and represented the state women's Volleyball team from 1957 to 1960.

Career 
Mohanty started her career as a singer at the All India Radio and continued to be a part of the organization for over 20 years. In 1944, she was introduced to theatre through the play 'Bhata' where she played the role of a lead actress. In 1949, she was offered a role on the Odiya movie Sri Jagannath. Her role as Lalita opposite Gopal Ghosh brought her fame and established her as a leading actress

During her career in theatre, she performed in over 100 plays in Odiya, Hindi, Bengali, Urdu and English and these plays were staged in various Indian cities. Mohanty also acted in Odia tele serials like Jibaku Debi Nahi, Thakura Ghara, Sara Akasha and Panata Kani.

Awards 
 Best Stage Actress Award by Prajatantra Prachar Samiti in 1952
 Odissa Sangeet Natak Akademi Award in 1992
 Jayadev Samman in 1992
 Gurukelucharan Mohapatra Award in 2011

Filmography

Last years and death 
Mohanty had a stroke and was undergoing treatment. She died on 11 December 2014. Her last rites were performed at the Satichoura Crematoium in Cuttack, Odisha.

References 

Indian film actresses
Actresses from Odisha
Odissi exponents
Performers of Indian classical dance
Indian female classical dancers
20th-century Indian dancers
Dancers from Odisha
20th-century Indian women artists
Women artists from Odisha
Recipients of the Sangeet Natak Akademi Award
1932 births
2014 deaths
People from Cuttack
21st-century Indian actresses
20th-century Indian actresses
Ollywood